Aquarius Records may refer to:
 Aquarius Records (store), a record store in San Francisco, California
 Aquarius Records (Canada), a Canadian independent record label
 Aquarius Records (Croatia), a Croatian record label
 Aquarius Records, a Jamaican record store and record label operated by Herman Chin Loy